Yancey is a Census Designated Place in Medina County, Texas, United States.  It is approximately 13 miles south of Hondo on Farm to Market Road 462 and 36 miles west of San Antonio. It is part of the San Antonio metropolitan area. 

According to an online community profile, Yancey has a population of 649 people. It has an oil business, an RV repair business and a restaurant called "Red's Place".

References

Unincorporated communities in Medina County, Texas
Unincorporated communities in Texas
Greater San Antonio